Turfdown is a hamlet east of Bodmin in Cornwall, England, United Kingdom.

References

Hamlets in Cornwall